Carminatia recondita is a Mesoamerican species of annual plants in the family Asteraceae.

Carminatia recondita is an annual herb with opposite leaves. Flower heads are borne in a spiked inflorescence, each head with about 11 greenish disc florets but no ray florets.

Carminatia recondita is found in Guatemala, El Salvador, Chiapas, Colima, Guerrero, Oaxaca, Jalisco,  México State, Michoacán, Morelos, Nayarit, Veracruz, Sinaloa, and San Luis Potosí.

References

External links
Photo of herbarium specimen collected in Sinaloa
Photo of herbarium specimen collected in Guatemala

Eupatorieae
Plants described in 1972
Flora of Central America
Flora of Mexico